Carabus robustus is a species of black-coloured beetle from the family Carabidae. Some species could be a mix of brown and black colour.

References

robustus
Beetles described in 1869